Terricula is a genus of moths belonging to the subfamily Tortricinae of the family Tortricidae.

Species
Terricula bifurcata Wang & Li, 2004
Terricula cnephaeana Razowski, 2008
Terricula graphitana Razowski, 2009
Terricula major Razowski, 2008
Terricula minor Razowski, 2008
Terricula violetana (Kawabe, 1964)

See also
List of Tortricidae genera

References

 , 1965, Ent. Obozr. 44: 418.
 ,2005 World Catalogue of Insects 5
 , 2009, Tortricidae from Vietnam in the collection of the Berlin Museum. 7.Some additional data (Lepidoptera: Tortricidae), Polish Journal of Entomology 78 (1): 15–32. Full article:

External links
tortricidae.com

Archipini
Tortricidae genera